The Showdown is a 1950 American Western film directed by Dorrell McGowan and Stuart E. McGowan and starring Wild Bill Elliott, Walter Brennan and Marie Windsor.

Plot
A former Texas lawman. Shadrach Jones (William Elliott) sets out to discover who killed his brother and stole their combined savings. While at the saloon run by the beautiful Adelaide (Marie Windsor), Jones becomes convinced that the thieving murderer is one of a group of cowboys on a cattle drive led by Captain MacKellar (Walter Brennan). Determined to find justice, Jones joins the cattle drive and slowly gets closer to uncovering the identity of the killer.

Cast
 Wild Bill Elliott as Shadrach Jones (as William Elliott)
 Walter Brennan as Cap MacKellar
 Marie Windsor as Adelaide
 Harry Morgan as Rod Main (as Henry Morgan)
 Rhys Williams as Chokecherry
 Jim Davis as Cochran
 William Ching as Mike Shattay
 Nacho Galindo as Gonzales
 Leif Erickson as Big Mart
 Henry Rowland as Dutch
 Charles Stevens as Indian Joe
 Victor Kilian as Hemp
 Yakima Canutt as Davis
 Guy Teague as Pickney
 William Steele as Terry
 Jack Sparks as Bartender

References

External links 
 

1950 films
American Western (genre) films
1950 Western (genre) films
Republic Pictures films
American black-and-white films
1950s English-language films
1950s American films